Francis Archer MRCS (1803–1875) was an Irish physician and naturalist.

He was born in Belfast on April 23, 1803, the son of a well-known Belfast bookseller. He studied medicine at Edinburgh.  He practiced in Liverpool, where he was the prison surgeon.

He was married to Frances Fletcher.  They had six children.

As a naturalist, he specialized in conchology, initiating what became the basis for a large family collection, some of which later became part of the Birmingham Museum and Art Gallery and also the Melvill-Tomlin collection of the National Museum Wales.

Archer was one of the founder members of the Belfast Natural History and Philosophical Society.  Later he became the first President of the Liverpool Natural History Society.  He was a member of the Liverpool Literary and Philosophical Society.   He also was a member of the Belfast Phrenological Society.

He died on April 5, 1875.

His two sons continued the work of their father --- Francis Archer Jr. (1839–92), a solicitor, journalist and naturalist who collected Mollusca  which he obtained on trips to Puffin Island and Liverpool, in conjunction with research activities of the Liverpool Biological Society;  and Samuel Archer, (1836–1902), an Army surgeon and ship's surgeon on the SS Great Britain, who collected shells in Singapore and many other parts of the world where he traveled, both with his regiment and in retirement.

References

External links
Biographical Etymology of Marine Organism Names. A
Ulster Biography

Irish zoologists
1803 births
1875 deaths
Irish naturalists
19th-century naturalists
Irish surgeons
Conchologists
People from Belfast
British malacologists